The narrow-tailed starling (Poeoptera lugubris) is a species of starling in the family Sturnidae. It is found in West and Central Africa from Sierra Leone to the Democratic Republic of the Congo.

Description 
The male is dark blue and the female is dark gray with chestnut-colored patches on the wings, visible in flight. Both sexes have long, narrow tails. Not a very noisy bird, this starling's vocalizations include shrill chirps, cries, and whistles.

Habitat 
Its habitat is the canopy of lowland forest, making use of secondary forest and forest clearings.

Diet 
It eats mostly fruit, and sometimes insects or seeds.

Behaviour 
These starlings form flocks of 10-30 or more birds, and sometimes will mix with other fruit-eating birds. This bird is a colony-nester, making its nest high up in dead trees in holes originally excavated by colonial cavity-nesting barbets, sometimes with both birds nesting in close proximity. Eggs are pale blue-gray with brown spots.

References

External links
Image at ADW

narrow-tailed starling
Birds of the Gulf of Guinea
Birds of Sub-Saharan Africa
narrow-tailed starling
narrow-tailed starling
Taxonomy articles created by Polbot